Marvin Lee Lamb (born July 12, 1946) is an American composer, music pedagogue and conductor.

Life 
Lamb was born in Jacksonville, Texas, studied at Sam Houston State University in Huntsville, Texas and received a Bachelor of Music in music theory and composition. He then studied at the University of North Texas in Denton and received a Master of Music. He completed his studies at the University of Illinois at Urbana–Champaign in Urbana and earned a Doctor of Musical Arts in composition. His teachers include John Butler, William P. Latham and Paul Zonn as well as electronic music and computer techniques with Herbert Brun and John Melby.

He worked at Atlantic Christian College, now Barton College, (1973–1977), at the Peabody College in Nashville, Tennessee (1977–1979), from 1980 to 1983 at Southern Methodist University in Dallas, from 1983 to 1989 at Tennessee Tech University, and from 1989 to 1998 he served as dean of the school of music and held the Yeager Endowed Professorship of Composition at Baylor University, at which point he became dean of the Weitzenhoffer Family College of Fine Arts at the University of Oklahoma (1998-2005). He is currently professor of music at the University of Oklahoma.

As a composer he writes works for different genres, with performances in Europe, Japan, Mexico, Argentina and Canada. He is a member of the American Society of Composers, Authors and Publishers (ASCAP), the fraternities Pi Kappa Lambda and Phi Mu Alpha Sinfonia, the American Music Center, the Southern Association of Colleges and Schools College Consulting Network and former president of the Texas Association of Music Schools.

Compositions

Works for orchestra 
 1972 Movements for trumpet, percussion, and string orchestra
 1977 Concerto for Tenor Saxophone and Orchestra
 1985 J.B. II, for picc., Dbl. Fl., Eng. Hrn., Dbl. Ob., and orchestra
 1987 Overture for orchestra
 1987 The Eagle has landed, for speaker, harp, piano, orchestra and narrator
 2010 Bop!, concertino for Theater Organ and Orchestra 
 2011 For Franco/Delicatissimo, for orchestra

Works for band 
 1985 Igor Fantasy, for band
 2001 Sacred Ground, Fanfare for band

Musical theatre

Incidental music 
 2010 The Dada Play – Incidental Music and Solo Songs, for tenor, mezzo-soprano, guitar, piano and vocal ensemble – text: Mieko Ouchi

Vocal music

Works for choir 
 1978 Sitio, for 3 vocal soloists, SATB choir, brass trio, organ, and percussion – text: David Cassel
 1981 The Annunciation, for Handbell choir, trompet, and SATB choir – text: Rainer Maria Rilke "Annunciation to Mary"
 2008 Bless This House, for SATB choir, brass quintet and piano

Solo vocal works 
 1970 Life Cycle, for tenor, flute, trumpet, and bassoon 
 1975 Lullabye on a text by George Barker, for soprano, clarinet, oboe, and piano

Chamber music 
 1968 Structures, for trombone and piano
 1970 Prairie Suite, for brass quintet
 1973 Woodwind Quintet
 1973 In Memoriam, Benjy, for saxophone quartet
 1974 Regards Broussards, for clarinet and trombone 
 1971 Solowalk, for flute 
 1973 The Professor March and Rag, six speakers/actors
 1979 Ballad of Roland, for alto saxophone and tinwhistle
 1981 Serenade for unknown friends, for oboe, clarinet, tenor saxophone, and piano
 1984 Music for Julius Baker, for flute choir 
 1984 Vision of Basque, for bassoon 
 1984 Heavy metal, for 5 tubas 
 1985 Prism, for trombone, piano, and percussion
 1986 Final Roland, for alto saxophone, whistle siren, piano, and harmonica
 1986 The Stomp Revisited, for brass quintet
 2006 A Fit Reliquary, for brass quintet and percussion orchestra (10 players)
 2008 Lamentations, for string quartet 
 2008 Grappelli Dreams, for alto saxophone and viola
 2008 House of Dawn, for 4 violas (or viola ensemble)
 2010 Pablo/Saul, for piccolo/flute, Eb, Bb, Bass Bb Cl, violin, cello, piano, and percussion
 2011 Fantasy, for viola and piano

Intermedia works 
 1972 Intonazione, for prepared tape, lights, and sculpture

Publications 
 The musical, literary and graphic influences upon Luciano Berio's Thema, Omaggio a Joyce, DMA Thesis – University of Illinois at Urbana-Champaign, 1977. 115 p.

Bibliography 
 Wolfgang Suppan, Armin Suppan: Das Neue Lexikon des Blasmusikwesens, 4. Auflage, Freiburg-Tiengen, Blasmusikverlag Schulz GmbH, 1994, 
 Paul E. Bierley, William H. Rehrig: The Heritage Encyclopedia of Band Music – Composers and Their Music, Westerville, Ohio: Integrity Press, 1991, 
 Jean-Marie Londeix: Musique pour saxophone, volume II : répertoire général des oeuvres et des ouvrages d' enseignement pour le saxophone, Cherry Hill: Roncorp Publications, 1985.
 E. Ruth Anderson: Contemporary American Composers – A Biographical Dictionary, Second edition, Boston: G. K. Hall, 1982, 578 p.,

References

External links 
Biography from the University of Oklahoma
Biography from Sigma Alpha Iota (SAI)
Biography from Media Press, Inc.

American male classical composers
American classical composers
20th-century classical composers
1946 births
Living people
20th-century American composers
20th-century American male musicians